Pul-e Khishti Mosque is the largest mosque in Kabul, Afghanistan. Located in the center of old Kabul, the Pul-e Khishti Mosque can be identified by its large blue dome. The mosque originally was erected in the late 18th century, but largely rebuilt under Zahir Shah in the late 1960s. It was damaged during fighting in the 1990s, but has been fully restored as of 2019.

Many Kabulis assert that the imam of this mosque for many years in the early part of the 20th century was an Englishman who had converted to Islam, and that the imam returned to England after relinquishing his position at the mosque.

Incidents

Gallery

See also
 Islam in Afghanistan

References

Mosques in Kabul
18th-century mosques